Metarbela stivafer is a moth in the family Cossidae. It is found in Equatorial Guinea and Gabon.

References

Natural History Museum Lepidoptera generic names catalog

Metarbelinae
Moths described in 1893